James Edward O'Neill (February 2, 1929 – March 6, 1987) was an American archivist who served as acting Archivist of the United States from September 1, 1979, through July 23, 1980. He was born in Renovo, Pennsylvania. He was also head of the US Presidential Libraries system. He died of a heart attack on March 6, 1987.

References

External links
 Official site
 Archivists of the United States, 1934–present

American archivists
People from Clinton County, Pennsylvania
1929 births
1987 deaths
Carter administration personnel